KSDX-LD, virtual and VHF digital channel 9, is a low-powered Estrella TV-owned-and-operated television station licensed to San Diego, California, United States. owned by Estrella Media It converted to digital about Oct 22, 2009.

Digital television

Digital channels

KSDX on KRCA-DT
KSDX-LP was available on digital subchannel 62.2 on its Los Angeles sister station KRCA. During that time, for some reason no audio was transmitted on the subchannel. KRCA has since discontinued the feed for KSDX on its subchannel and instead runs Estrella News.

References

External links

SDX-LD
Television channels and stations established in 1997
Low-power television stations in the United States
Estrella Media stations